The Grey Lag Handicap was an American Thoroughbred horse race run annually at Aqueduct Racetrack in Queens, New York. Open to horses age three and older, in its final years it was contested on dirt over a distance of one and three-sixteenths miles (9.5 furlongs).

Inaugurated on May 10, 1941 at the Jamaica Race Course, the race was named in honor of 1921 American Horse of the Year and U.S. Racing Hall of Fame inductee, Grey Lag. It was last run in 1999 at Aqueduct Racetrack as a Grade III event.

Winners of the Grey Lag Handicap include U.S. Racing Hall of Fame inductees Assault, Nashua, Arts and Letters, Stymie, Sword Dancer, and Tom Fool.

Winners

1999 - Carta de Amor
1998 - Brushing Up
1997 - More To Tell
1996 - Iron Gavel
1995 - Danzig's Dance
1994 - As Indicated
1993 - Conveyor
1992 - Shots Are Ringing
1991 - Apple Current
1990 - Double Blush
1989 - Lay Down
1988 - King's Swan
1987 - Proud Debonair
1986 - Artichoke 
1985 - Imp Society
1984 - Moro
1983 - Sing Sing
1982 - Globe
1981 - Irish Tower
1980 - I'm It 
1979 - Special Tiger
1978 - On The Sly
1977 - Turn And Count
1976 - Royal Glint
1975 - Gold and Myrrh
1974 - Prove Out
1973 - Summer Guest
1972 - Droll Role
1971 - Judgable
1970 - Arts and Letters
1969 - Bushid
1968 - Bold Hour
1967 - Moontrip
1966 - Selari
1965 - Quita Dude
1964 - Saidam
1963 - Sunrise County
1962 - Ambiopoise
1961 - Mail Order
1960 - Sword Dancer
1959 - Vertex
1958 - Oh Johnny
1957 - Kingmaker
1956 - Nashua
1955 - no race
1954 - no race
1953 - Find
1952 - Tom Fool
1951 - Cochise
1950 - Lotowhite
1949 - Royal Governor
1948 - no race
1947 - Assault
1946 - Stymie
1945 - Stymie
1944 - First Fiddle
1943 - Boysy
1942 - Marriage
1941 - Dit

References
 May 11, 1941 Hartford Courant report on Dit winning the inaugural edition of the Grey Lag Handicap
 March 6, 1999 Associated Press report on Carta de Amor winning the Grey Lag Handicap

Discontinued horse races in New York City
Graded stakes races in the United States
Aqueduct Racetrack
Jamaica Race Course
Recurring sporting events established in 1941
Recurring sporting events disestablished in 1999
1941 establishments in New York City
1999 disestablishments in New York (state)